The Eldorado Radium Silver Express (alternately Radium Express) was the name of a semi-regular air service between Edmonton, Alberta and Port Radium, Northwest Territories, or between Port Radium and a refinery at Port Hope, Ontario.
A single airplane, a Bellanca Aircruiser, a small bush plane, provided this service, from 1935 to 1947.

During the late 1930s Port Radium was one of the few sources of radium.

During World War II, the mine was the main source for the uranium used by the atomic bomb program.
Other than the air charter, goods and personnel could only be conveyed to and from the northernmost terminus of the North American railway grid, at Waterways, Alberta, was by water, a  trip that took weeks.  The rivers are frozen almost eight months of the year, closing down the initial leg of the trip.

The plane crashed in northern Ontario in 1947.
The  Western Canada Aviation Museum is trying to restore the aircraft.

Eldorado Aviation continued to operate for several more years and was still listed in the federal Financial Administration Act as a Crown corporation in the 1970s.

See also 
 List of defunct airlines of Canada

References

Regional airlines of the Northwest Territories
Defunct airlines of Canada
Defunct seaplane operators
Regional airlines of Alberta
Regional airlines of Ontario